Nikola Vasiljević may refer to:

 Nikola Vasiljević (Bosnian footballer) (born 1983), defender for Shakhter Karagandy, Drina Zvornik, and FK Modriča
 Nikola Vasiljević (Serbian footballer, born 1983), defender for FK Leotar
 Nikola Vasiljević (footballer, born 1991), Serbian defender for Tokushima Vortis
 Nikola Vasiljević (footballer, born 1996), Serbian football goalkeeper for Radnik Surdulica